Tip Top is a ghost town in Yavapai County in the U.S. state of Arizona. The town was settled in 1876 in what was then the Arizona Territory.

History
Primarily a silver-mining town, it had a post office from August 12, 1880, until February 14, 1895.  The town was founded after Jack Moore and Bill Corning struck a significant lode of silver in 1875.

The nearby ghost town of Gillett was the original mill site for the ore from the Tip Top mine.

Tip Top at its peak had over 500 residents and was one of the largest towns in Arizona at the time.

Tip Top's population was 65 in 1890.

Many ruins still exist in Tip Top today.

Tip Top is the setting for The Nightjar Women, the last story in the weird western anthology Merkabah Rider: Tales of a High Planes Drifter by Edward M. Erdelac.

References

External links
 
 
 Tip Top on Ghosttowns.com
 Tip Top on Arizona Pioneer &  Cemetery Research Project
 Tip Tip on the Ghost Town of the Month

Ghost towns in Arizona
Former populated places in Yavapai County, Arizona
Mining communities in Arizona
1876 establishments in Arizona Territory